Megachile fortis is a species of bee in the family Megachilidae. It was described by Cresson in 1872.

References

Fortis
Insects described in 1872